Lisia Góra  is a village in Tarnów County, Lesser Poland Voivodeship, in southern Poland. It is the seat of the gmina (administrative district) called Gmina Lisia Góra.

The village has a population of 3,019.

References

Villages in Tarnów County